Nicolas Orsini (born September 9, 1994) is an Argentine footballer who plays as a striker for Boca Juniors.

Club statistics
Updated to 20 February 2017.

Honours
Boca Juniors
Primera División: 2022
Copa Argentina: 2019–20
Copa de la Liga Profesional: 2022
Supercopa Argentina: 2022

References

External links
 
 
 

1994 births
Living people
Argentine people of Italian descent
Argentine footballers
Argentine expatriate footballers
Atlético de Rafaela footballers
Tokushima Vortis players
Fagiano Okayama players
FC Anyang players
SV Horn players
Sportivo Luqueño players
Club Atlético Sarmiento footballers
Club Atlético Lanús footballers
Boca Juniors footballers
Argentine Primera División players
J2 League players
K League 2 players
2. Liga (Austria) players
Primera Nacional players
Paraguayan Primera División players
Expatriate footballers in Japan
Argentine expatriate sportspeople in Japan
Expatriate footballers in South Korea
Argentine expatriate sportspeople in South Korea
Expatriate footballers in Austria
Argentine expatriate sportspeople in Austria
Expatriate footballers in Paraguay
Argentine expatriate sportspeople in Paraguay
Association football forwards
Sportspeople from Córdoba Province, Argentina